Your Christmas or Mine? is a 2022 Christmas romantic comedy film directed by Jim O'Hanlon from a screenplay by Tom Parry , produced by Kate Heggie and starring Asa Butterfield, Daniel Mays, Angela Griffin and Cora Kirk.

Plot

Young student couple James and Hayley both decide to surprise the other at Christmas only to have to accidentally experience Christmas with each other’s families. Hayley ends up with James‘s military father, Lord Humphrey The Earl of Gloucester, at his country house. James, on the other hand, ends up with Hayley‘s working class family, in Macclesfield 

Hayley calls James and both urge each other to keep their relationship secret, as both have not told their parents yet. Also, it turns out that James‘ father is under the impression that his son is following the family tradition and is studying at the Royal Military Academy Sandhurst, which he secretly dropped out of to study drama. Hayley pretends to be a class mate of his army training, but her cover is blown quickly. 

Both try to leave their respective host family, but all trains are cancelled due to bad weather. Hayley tries to reignite Christmas spirit in the manor by decorating the manor. Things go awry when Humphrey’s dog is accidentally shot by a neighbour, upsetting Humphrey, who also disapproves of the decorations. Meanwhile, James has a spa day with Hayley‘s female relatives until he meets Steve, who turns out to be Hayley‘s fiancée, with whom she secretly broke up. Steve and James get into a fight, during which he reveals that he is Hayley‘s boyfriend and that she chose to not be with her family, after which he angrily leaves.

Hayley has left the manor but forgot her asthma medication. She collapsed but is saved by Humphrey. Hayley‘s father is relieved that she has broken up with Steve, whom he has always disliked. Her entire family decides to take James to his family, so that they are all reunited for Christmas. Hayley and James sort out their differences and reconcile.

Cast
 Asa Butterfield as Hubert James Hughes
Cora Kirk as Hayley Taylor
Daniel Mays as Geoff Taylor
Angela Griffin as Kath Taylor
Harriet Walter as Iris
David Bradley as Jack
Natalie Gumede as Kaye Taylor
Alex Jennings as Humphrey Hughes
Lucien Laviscount as Steve
Ram John Holder as Anthony
Mark Heap as Railway Conductor

Production
Filming took place in August 2021 at Pinewood Studios of comedian Parry’s debut screenplay and produced by Kate Heggie at Shiny Buttons Productions. Executive producers are Kris Thykier and Andy Brereton. O’Hanlon described the screenplay as having “warmth, humour, and emotional honesty” and credited it with attracting the cast to the project. Butterfield also praised Parry’s writing describing to The Times how “it captured the essence of a crazy family Christmas,” and how when filming “a lot of it played out like a piece of theatre. Especially when we were shooting those scenes where everyone’s running around screaming. All those Christmas jokes and traditions, which we all have, but it’s rare to see that captured so organically.”

Release
The film was released on Amazon Prime Video on 2 December 2022.

Reception
Benjamin Lee in The Guardian described the film as "hackneyed grab-bag of sitcom cliches that ends up feeling more like tired pantomime" advising to "leave this one under the tree". Simon Brew for Film Stories described it as a "comfortably familiar Christmas caper" praising "a sharp script, committed performances and a rootable central couple…the result is a really solidly made festive caper."

See also
 List of Christmas films

References

External links
 

2022 films
2020s English-language films
British romantic comedy films
British Christmas comedy films
Films set in Gloucestershire
Films set in Cheshire
Films directed by Jim O'Hanlon
2020s British films